The 2018–19 Florida Atlantic Owls men's basketball team represented Florida Atlantic University during the 2018–19 NCAA Division I men's basketball season. The Owls, led by first-year head coach Dusty May, played their home games at the FAU Arena in Boca Raton, Florida as members of Conference USA.

Previous season 
The Owls finished the 2017–18 season 12–19, 6–12 in C-USA play to finish in a tie for 11th place. They lost in the first round of the C-USA tournament to UAB.

March 16, 2018, head coach Michael Curry was fired after four seasons at Florida Atlantic. On March 22, it was announced that the school had hired Florida assistant head coach Dusty May as head coach.

Offseason

Departures

Incoming transfers

2018 recruiting class

2019 recruiting class

Roster

Schedule and results

|-
!colspan=12 style=| Exhibition

|-
!colspan=12 style=| Non-conference regular season

|-
!colspan=12 style=| Conference USA regular season

|-
!colspan=12 style=|Conference USA tournament

|-
!colspan=12 style=|CollegeInsider.com Postseason tournament

Source

References

Florida Atlantic Owls men's basketball seasons
Florida Atlantic
Florida Atlantic Owls men's b
Florida Atlantic Owls men's b
Florida Atlantic